UFC Fight Night: Florian vs. Lauzon (also known as UFC Fight Night 13) was a mixed martial arts (MMA) event held by the Ultimate Fighting Championship (UFC) on April 2, 2008, at the Broomfield Event Center in Broomfield, Colorado, United States.

Background
The event was a lead-in to the premiere of The Ultimate Fighter 7 on Spike. Instead of scheduling a two-hour program usually set for UFC Fight Night cards, the event was a three-hour broadcast, a change due to a petition from Sherdog Forums and a letter-writing campaign by MMA fans to Spike.

Fight Night 13 was the first UFC event to be held in Colorado since The Ultimate Ultimate was held in Denver on December 16, 1995.

Stephan Bonnar was originally slated to take on Matt Hamill, but was forced to withdraw when he suffered a complete tear of his left collateral knee ligament during training. He was replaced by Tim Boetsch, who took the fight on only ten days notice.

A planned bout between lightweights Spencer Fisher and Marcus Aurélio was cancelled due to a shoulder injury Fisher suffered during training. On March 20, 2008, the UFC website announced that newcomer Ryan Roberts was to make his octagon debut on short notice to face Marcus Aurélio as a replacement for the injured Spencer Fisher.

This event also marked the first bout of a series of fights between Frankie Edgar and Gray Maynard.

Results

Bonus awards
At the end of this event, $20,000 was awarded to each of the fighters who received one of these three awards.

Fight of the Night: Kenny Florian vs. Joe Lauzon
Knockout of the Night: James Irvin
Submission of the Night: Nate Diaz

See also
 Ultimate Fighting Championship
 List of UFC champions
 List of UFC events
 2008 in UFC

References

UFC Fight Night
2008 in mixed martial arts
Mixed martial arts in Colorado
Sports in Broomfield, Colorado
2008 in Colorado
Events in Broomfield, Colorado